In organic chemistry, a cumulene is a compound having three or more cumulative (consecutive) double bonds. They are analogous to allenes, only having a more extensive chain. The simplest molecule in this class is butatriene, which is also called simply cumulene. Unlike most alkanes and alkenes, cumulenes tend to be rigid, comparable to polyynes. Cumulene carbenes  for n from 3 to 6 have been observed in interstellar molecular clouds and in laboratory experiments by using microwave and infrared spectroscopy. (The more stable cumulenes  are difficult to detect optically because they lack an electric dipole moment.) Cumulenes containing heteroatoms are called heterocumulenes; an example is carbon suboxide.

Synthesis
The first reported synthesis of a butatriene is that of tetraphenylbutatriene in 1921. The most common synthetic method for butatriene synthesis is based on reductive coupling of a geminal dihalovinylidene. Tetraphenylbutatriene was reported synthesized in 1977 by homocoupling of 2,2-diphenyl-1,1,1-tribromoethane with elemental copper in dimethylformamide.

Structure

The rigidity of cumulenes arises from the fact that the internal carbon atoms carry two double bonds. Their sp hybridisation results in two π bonds, one to each neighbor, which are perpendicular to each other. This bonding reinforces a linear geometry of the carbon chain.

Cumulenes with non-equivalent substituents on each end exhibit isomerism. If the number of consecutive double bonds is odd, there is cis–trans isomerism as for alkenes. If the number of consecutive double bonds is even, there is axial chirality as for allenes.

Transition metal cumulenes
The first reported complex containing a vinylidene ligand was (Ph2C2Fe2(CO)8, derived from the reaction of diphenylketene and Fe(CO)5  Structurally, this molecule resembles Fe2(CO)9, wherein one μ-CO ligand is replaced by 1,1-diphenylvinylidene, Ph2C2.  The first monometallic vinylidene complex was (C5H5)Mo(P(C6H5)3)(CO)2[C=C(CN)2]Cl.

See also
 Cyclopropatriene and cyclohexahexaene, cyclic cumulenes

References

 
Astrochemistry